Buyant may refer to:

 Buyant, Bayan-Ölgii, a sum (district) in Bayan-Ölgii Province, western Mongolia
 Buyant, Khovd, a sum (district) in Khovd Province, western Mongolia
 Buyant River, a river in Khovd Province, western Mongolia
 Buyant-Ukhaa International Airport, Ulaanbaatar, Mongolia

See also
 Buyan (disambiguation)
 Buyantu (1285–1320), fourth emperor of the Yuan dynasty